Journey to the Sun is a 1999 Turkish drama film written and directed by Yeşim Ustaoğlu. It was entered into the 49th Berlin International Film Festival where it won the Blue Angel Award.

Cast
 Nazmi Kırık as Berzan (as Nazmi Qirix)
 Newroz Baz as Mehmet
 Mizgin Kapazan as Arzu
 Ara Güler as Süleyman Bey
 Lucia Marano as Sexy girl

References

External links

1999 films
1990s Turkish-language films
1999 drama films
Films directed by Yeşim Ustaoğlu
Turkish drama films